The Future Harvest Consortium to Rebuild Agriculture in Afghanistan (FHCRAA) is a consortium of aid organizations working to restructure agriculture in the south Asian nation. In the beginning of January 2002, ICARDA, with the support of USAID, brought together 34 organizations including CGIAR centers and other research institutes, relief and development organizations, NGOs, U.S. universities, donor agencies and the Afghanistan Ministry of Agriculture at a meeting in Tashkent, Uzbekistan. FHCRAA was the result.

The first stage was to identify areas, aid recipients and donor agency capabilities. The most important partners were USAID, CGIAR, ICARDA [International Center for Agricultural Research in the Dry Areas] and ICRIST (International Crops Research Institute for the Semi-Arid Tropics). CGIAR is a strategic alliance of countries, international and regional organizations, and private foundations supporting 15 international agricultural centers that work with national agricultural programs and civil society organizations including the private sector.

Participants
Groups participating included:

International Center for Agricultural Research in the Dry Areas- ICARDA
International Crops Research Institute for the Semi-Arid Tropics-ICRISAT
International Center for Tropical Agriculture -CIAT
International Maize and Wheat Improvement Center- CIMMYT
International Potato Center-CIP
World Vegetable Center-AVRDC
International Center for Development Oriented Research in Agriculture (ICRA)
International Fertilizer Development Center- IFDC
Ministry of Agriculture, Irrigation and Livestock (Afghanistan)- (MAI)
AKDN
MADERA
MC
ACTED; DACAARZ
FOCUS; ISRA
FAO; WFP
Texas A & M University
Cornell University
University of California, Davis
Michigan State University
USAID
International Development Research Centre (IDRC)
Department for International Development (DFID)
Japan International Cooperation Agency (JICA)
OPEC Fund for International Development
International Potato Center (CIP)
DACCAR
International Center for Research in Agro-forestry Research
Purdue University and other countries and aid organizations etc.

Notes

External links 
Afghanistan and ICARDA FHCRAA PARTNERS AND DONORS
 
Rebuilding Afghanistan’s Agricultural Markets
Program (RAMP)

References 
Rebuilding Agricultural in Afghanistan ICARDA WEB 
Afghanistan Minister of Agriculture Opens Steering Committee Meeting of Future Harvest Consortium
 
The Role of FHCRAA in RALF  

Agriculture in Afghanistan
Non-profit organisations based in Afghanistan
Foreign aid to Afghanistan